The coat of arms of the President of the Republic of North Macedonia is the official coat of arms of the President of North Macedonia. It was adopted on 2 December 2009, designed by the Macedonian Heraldry Society earlier that year, having been registered by the society on 10 June.

The shield of the coat of arms has the sun from the flag of North Macedonia. Below the shield are two branches of Macedonian oak with eight leaves and acorns on each branch. The oak is used due to it being native to the region and representing strength.

The coat of arms was designed by the Macedonian Heraldry Society members Stojanče Veličkovski, Petar Gajdov and Jovan Jonovski.

See also
Flag of the Republic of North Macedonia
National emblem of North Macedonia
National Anthem of North Macedonia
Golden Lion of Macedonia
Vergina Flag (Republic of Macedonia)

References

 
Coats of arms